Boone County is a county in the U.S. state of Iowa. As of the 2020 census, the population was 26,715. Its county seat is Boone.

Boone County comprises the Boone, IA Micropolitan Statistical Area, which is included in the Des Moines-Ames-West Des Moines, IA Combined Statistical Area.

History
The land that now forms Boone and several other Iowa counties was ceded by the Sac and Fox nation to the United States in a treaty signed on October 11, 1842.

On January 13, 1846, the legislative body of the Indiana Territory authorized creation of twelve counties in the Iowa Territory, with general descriptions of their boundaries. Boone County's name referred to Captain Nathan Boone, son of Daniel Boone, an American pioneer who formed the Wilderness Trail and founded the settlement of Boonesborough, Kentucky.

County residents selected Boonesboro as the county seat in 1851. The first building erected in the new settlement was a double log house, to be used as interim county office and courthouse. It was supplemented by a two–story building erected in 1856, then replaced by a three-story building in 1868.

The nearby settlement of Montana was incorporated in 1866, when a railway station was built there. It was renamed to Boone in 1871. It continued to grow, and it annexed the settlement of Boonesboro (which had also been incorporated in 1866) in 1887, thus becoming the county seat.

After the second courthouse became too small for the county's expanding populace, a new building (the present courthouse) replaced it. It was completed in 1917.

Geography

Major highways
 U.S. Highway 30 – runs east–west through center of county. Passes Beaver, Ogden, and Jordan.
 U.S. Highway 169 – runs south from Webster County through the west-central portion of Boone County. At its intersection with US 30, U.S. 169 runs east three miles to Ogden, then runs south to Dallas County.
 Iowa Highway 17 – runs south through eastern Boone County to Jordan, west one mile, then south to the boundary line between Dallas and Polk counties.
 Iowa Highway 144 – runs across the southwest tip of the county from northwest to southeast.
 Iowa Highway 210 – enters south line of county at Woodward, then runs east and east-northeast across the southern portion of county to Story County.

Adjacent counties
Dallas County – south
Greene County – west
Hamilton County – north and northeast
Polk County – south and southeast
Story County – east
Webster County – north and northwest

Demographics

2020 census
There were 11,921 housing units of which 10,981 were occupied.

2010 census
There were 11,756 housing units, of which 10,728 were occupied.

2000 census
	
As of the census of 2000, there were 26,224 people, 10,374 households, and 7,137 families residing in the county. The population density was 46 people per square mile (18/km2). There were 10,968 housing units at an average density of 19 per square mile (7/km2). The racial makeup of the county was 98.53% White, 0.36% Black or African American, 0.20% Native American, 0.22% Asian, 0.26% from other races, and 0.43% from two or more races. 0.83% of the population were Hispanic or Latino of any race.

There were 10,374 households, out of which 31.20% had children under the age of 18 living with them, 58.00% were married couples living together, 7.80% had a female householder with no husband present, and 31.20% were non-families. 26.70% of all households were made up of individuals, and 11.80% had someone living alone who was 65 years of age or older. The average household size was 2.44 and the average family size was 2.95.

In the county, the population was spread out, with 24.80% under the age of 18, 8.40% from 18 to 24, 27.10% from 25 to 44, 23.30% from 45 to 64, and 16.40% who were 65 years of age or older. The median age was 39 years. For every 100 females there were 95.90 males. For every 100 females age 18 and over, there were 91.70 males.

The median income for a household in the county was $40,763, and the median income for a family was $49,346. Males had a median income of $32,504 versus $23,838 for females. The per capita income for the county was $19,943. About 4.50% of families and 7.60% of the population were below the poverty line, including 8.00% of those under age 18 and 5.90% of those age 65 or over.

Communities

Cities

Beaver
Berkley
Boone (county seat)
Boxholm
Fraser
Luther
Madrid
Ogden
Woodward (partial)
Pilot Mound
Sheldahl (partial)

Unincorporated communities

Jordan
Logansport
Mackey
Moingona
Zenorsville

Townships

 Amaqua
 Beaver
 Cass
 Colfax
 Des Moines
 Dodge
 Douglas
 Garden
 Grant
 Harrison
 Jackson
 Marcy
 Peoples
 Pilot Mound
 Union
 Worth
 Yell

Population ranking
The population ranking of the following table is based on the 2020 census of Boone County.
† county seat

Politics
Prior to 1932, Boone County was primarily Republican in presidential elections, aside from 1912 when the county backed Bull Moose candidate & former Republican President Theodore Roosevelt. From 1932 to 1980, the county was a swing county, voting for the national winner in all elections in that period aside from 1960. From 1984 to 2012, the county was consistently Democratic in presidential elections, but swung hard in 2016 by 20.7 points to back Republican Donald Trump similar to many other counties in Iowa.

See also

Boone County Courthouse (Iowa)
National Register of Historic Places listings in Boone County, Iowa
Don Williams County Park

References

External links
 Boone County on state government portal
 Boone County government's website
 Boone County Republican, Google news archive. —PDFs of 1,242 issues, dating from 1873 to 1897.

 
1846 establishments in Iowa Territory
Populated places established in 1846